Afripupa is a genus of very small air-breathing land snails, terrestrial pulmonate gastropod mollusks in the subfamily Nesopupinae  of the family Vertiginidae.

Taxonomy
This genus has become a synonym of Vertigo (Staurodon) R. T. Lowe, 1852 represented as Vertigo O. F. Müller, 1773. Afripupa has been formerly assigned to the Nesopupinae. The recent molecular phylogeny of the Vertiginidae by Nekola & Coles (2016) suggests a close relationship of Afripupa with Vertigo instead.

Species
 † Afripupa blumi (O. Boettger, 1884) 
 Afripupa densestriata (Adam, 1954)
 Afripupa kanongae (Adam, 1954)
 † Afripupa kenyensis Pickford, 2019 
 Afripupa misaliensis Gittenberger & van Bruggen, 2013
 Afripupa pelengeae (Adam, 1954)
 Afripupa rodriguezensis (Connolly, 1925)
 Afripupa vengoensis (Connolly, 1925)
Species brought into synonymy
 Afripupa bisulcata (Jickeli, 1873): synonym of Vertigo bisulcata (Jickeli, 1873)
 Afripupa farquhari (Pilsbry, 1917): synonym of Vertigo farquhari Pilsbry, 1917 (superseded combination)
 Afripupa griqualandica (Melvill & Ponsonby, 1893): synonym of Vertigo griqualandica (Melvill & Ponsonby, 1893) (superseded combination)
 Afripupa iota (Preston, 1911): synonym of Afripupa bisulcata (Jickeli, 1873): synonym of Vertigo bisulcata (Jickeli, 1873) (junior synonym)

References

 Bank, R. A. (2017). Classification of the Recent terrestrial Gastropoda of the World. Last update: July 16th, 2017

External links
 https://www.biodiversitylibrary.org/page/23703860

Vertiginidae
Gastropod genera